Second Chance Heroes is a 2014 action role-playing hack and slash video game by Canadian indie developer Rocket City Studios that revolves around clones of historical figures fighting enemy forces in an apocalyptic arena. It was released on July 4, 2014. Shortly after the games release it was removed from all app stores and digital marketplaces. The reason for the removal is unknown.

Gameplay
The game featured a variety of clones of historical figures including Abraham Lincoln, Joan of Arc, Napoleon and Elizabeth I fighting their way through swarms of enemies during 26 apocalyptic levels.

Releases

iOS edition
On February 17, 2014, Rocket City Studios released an iOS version of Second Chance Heroes in the App Store.

Microsoft Windows, OS X
The Microsoft Windows and OS X versions of the game were originally due to be released on June 20, 2014, but due to the Steam Summer Sale, the game was delayed until July 4, 2014.

Reception

Critical reception

Second Chance Heroes received generally positive reviews on iOS from critics, attaining scores of 83.33% and 84/100 on aggregate review websites GameRankings and Metacritic respectively.

References

External links
 

Role-playing video games
Action role-playing video games
Cooperative video games
IOS games
MacOS games
Multiplayer online games
PlayStation Network games
Video games developed in Canada
Video games featuring female protagonists
Video games with expansion packs
Windows games
2014 video games